Gösta is a 2019 Swedish language comedy TV series directed by Lukas Moodysson. The series is produced by HBO Europe and the first four episodes were released on 1 July 2019.

The plot revolves around Gösta (played by Vilhelm Blomgren), a 28-year old child psychologist on his first job in a town in Småland. His ambition is to be the kindest person in the world, which doesn't always go according to plan.

References

External links

2010s Swedish television series
2019 Swedish television series debuts
HBO Europe original programming
Television shows set in Sweden
Swedish-language television shows